One Raffles Place, formerly Overseas Union Bank Centre or OUB Centre is a skyscraper in Downtown Core, Singapore. The building sits at the city centre of Raffles Place.

Architecture

 The building consists of two triangular structures with a small space between them.
 The steel frame allows for column-free office space.
 The floor system is of reinforced concrete slab composite with a ribbed steel deck.
 A car park, retail areas, and a link to the MRT system can be found above and below ground.
 The tower is clad with chemically treated aluminium alloy which changes colour along with the light it reflects.
 Square and circular designs perforate the building's façade, etched by a grid pattern of rectangles and window units.
 The dramatic entrance is presented by an eight-storey cutaway, coupled with skylights and other lighting effects to create an airy feeling.

Events
Frenchman Alain Robert, well known for climbing skyscrapers, aborted an attempted climb on this building on 3 November 2000. After reaching the 21st floor, the police dissuaded Robert's ascent, and he re-entered the building through a window on the 23rd floor. He was detained by the Singapore police who treated his stunt as criminal trespass.

New tower
A new commercial tower was constructed next to the existing tower. The ground bearing ceremony was on 26 September 2008, with construction completed by 2011. The new tower was opened in 2012 with 38 floors. Upon completion of the new tower, the complex was officially renamed One Raffles Place.

See also
 List of tallest buildings in Singapore
 List of tallest freestanding steel structures
 List of buildings

References

External links

 Former OUB Centre Limited website
 Official website

Raffles Place
Skyscraper office buildings in Singapore
Shopping malls in Singapore
Office buildings completed in 1986
Downtown Core (Singapore)
20th-century architecture in Singapore